The Saskatoon Olympics were a Tier-II Junior "A" team based in Saskatoon, Saskatchewan, who played in the Saskatchewan Junior Hockey League.

History
The Saskatoon Olympics were original members of the Saskatchewan Junior Hockey League when the league was founded in 1968.  They were eligible for the Memorial Cup playoffs for their first two seasons, then the SJHL was placed at the Tier-II Junior "A" level.

The team took on the name Saskatoon J's for a couple of years before folding in 1982.

Season-by-season standings

Playoffs
1969 Lost Semi-final
Weyburn Red Wings defeated Saskatoon Olympics 4-games-to-none
1970 Lost Semi-final
Regina Pats defeated Saskatoon Olympics 4-games-to-1
1971 Lost Semi-final
Humboldt Broncos defeated Saskatoon Olympics 4-games-to-3
1972 Lost Semi-final
Saskatoon Olympics defeated Notre Dame Hounds 4-games-to-none
Humboldt Broncos defeated Saskatoon Olympics 4-games-to-none
1973 DNQ
1974 Lost Semi-final
Saskatoon Olympics defeated Yorkton Terriers 4-games-to-1
Prince Albert Raiders defeated Saskatoon Olympics 4-games-to-none
1975 Lost Quarter-final
Prince Albert Raiders defeated Saskatoon Olympics 4-games-to-1
1976 DNQ
1977 DNQ
1978 DNQ
1979 DNQ
1980 DNQ
1981 DNQ
1982 Lost Quarter-final
Swift Current Broncos defeated Saskatoon Olympics 4-games-to-2

External links
SJHL Website

Sport in Saskatoon
Defunct Saskatchewan Junior Hockey League teams
Defunct sports teams in Saskatchewan